The 2007 Walsall Metropolitan Borough Council election took place on 3 May 2007 to elect members of Walsall Metropolitan Borough Council in the West Midlands, England. One third of the council was up for election and the Conservative Party stayed in overall control of the council.

After the election, the composition of the council was:
Conservative 33
Labour 18
Liberal Democrats 6
Independent 2
Democratic Labour Party 1

Background
After the last election in 2006 the Conservatives controlled the council with 34 seats, compared to 19 for Labour, 6 Liberal Democrats and 1 independent. However, in July 2006 2 Conservative councillors, Aqeel Aslam and Haqnawaz Khan of Pleck and St Matthews wards respectively, defected to Labour, leaving the Conservatives on 32 seats compared to 21 for Labour.

Election result
The results saw the Conservatives gain 1 seat from Labour in Pleck, to move to 33 seats, and stay in control of the council. As well as the loss to the Conservatives, Labour lost a further 2 seats and so fell to 18 councillors. The other Labour losses came in Darlaston South, where independent Chris Bott gained the seat, and in Blakenall, where Peter Smith of the Democratic Labour Party, took the seat by 15 votes. Meanwhile, the Liberal Democrats won 2 seats and stayed on 6 councillors.

Ward results

References

2007 English local elections
2007
2000s in the West Midlands (county)